Lynn K. Nyhart is the  Vilas-Bablitch-Kelch Distinguished Achievement Professor in the Department of the History of Science at the University of Wisconsin–Madison. She served as president of the History of Science Society from 2012 to 2013. Her main areas of interest are the history of biology, international transfer of ideas, relations between elite and popular science, and theories of individuality, parts, and wholes. Her book Modern Nature: The Rise of the Biological Perspective in Germany received the Susan E. Abrams Prize in 2009.

Early life and education
Nyhart received her A.B. from Princeton University in 1979, her M.A. from the  University of Pennsylvania in 1982, and her Ph.D. from the University of Pennsylvania in 1986. Her Ph.D. supervisor was Mark B. Adams. Her thesis was Morphology and the German University, 1860–1900.

Career
Nyhart taught at the Lyman Briggs School and Department of History at Michigan State University (1986–87) and was a visiting faculty member at Princeton University before joining the Department of the History of Science at the University of Wisconsin–Madison. She has risen from assistant professor (1988–95), to associate professor (1995–2006), and to full professor (2006–present). She has served as chair of the Department of the History of Science, and has been involved in the Women's Studies Program. In 2012 she became the Vilas-Bablitch-Kelch Distinguished Achievement Professor in the Department of the History of Science.

She writes on the history of biology, focusing particularly on natural history in nineteenth century Germany. In Biology Takes Form: Animal Morphology and the German Universities, 1800–1900 (1994) she studies a wide variety of movements and institutions, seeking coherence in the history of the life sciences in nineteenth century German thought. Adapting a framework from E. S. Russell, she examines initially loosely defined morphological approaches, to trace the multi-stranded development of "scientific zoology". Two evolutionary morphologist who she discusses in detail are Carl Gegenbaur and Ernst Haeckel. This has been applauded as "a very ambitious book that tries to do many things and does most of them quite well."

Modern Nature: The Rise of the Biological Perspective in Germany (2009) examines the transition from a natural science of collecting and taxonomic classification to a dynamic examination of the interactions of organisms, with each other and within their environments. She looks at the transfer of ideas in museums and educational institutions, focusing on figures such as Philipp Leopold Martin, Friedrich Junge, and Karl August Möbius to understand the modernization of ideas.  Described as "an exemplary book of historical scholarship", it received the Susan E. Abrams Prize in 2009.

Nyhart was co-organizer (with Scott Lidgard) of the 2012 Gordon Cain Conference, “E pluribus unum: Bringing Biological Parts and Wholes into Historical and Philosophical Perspective” at the Chemical Heritage Foundation.

She served as president of the History of Science Society from 2012 to 2013. Her  "future history", The shape of the history of science profession, 2038: a prospective retrospective, discussed non-traditional paths in history of science and speculated on the collaborative development of a "citizen history of science".

Works 
 Modern Nature: The Rise of the Biological Perspective in Germany (University of Chicago Press, 2009)
 Des sciences citoyennes? La question de l’amateur dans les sciences naturalistes (Citizen sciences? The question of the amateur in the natural-history sciences). La Tour d’Aigues (France): Editions de l’Aube, 2007. Co-editor, with Florian Charvolin and André Micoud.
 Science and Civil Society Co-editor, with Thomas Broman, Osiris, Volume 17. (University of Chicago Press, 2002).
 Biology Takes Form: Animal Morphology and the German Universities, 1800–1900 (University of Chicago Press, 1994).

Awards
 2011–16: Kellett Mid-Career Award, UW-Madison (5-year award)
 2012, Gordon Cain Conference Fellow, Chemical Heritage Foundation
 2011, Guggenheim Fellow
 2009, Susan E. Abrams Prize in History of Science for Modern Nature: The Rise of the Biological Perspective in Germany

References

External links

 Lynn K Nyhart
 "Bio-History in the Anthropocene: Interdisciplinary Study on the Past and Present of Human Life" Kyle Harper, Lynn K. Nyhart, Jonathan Lyon, Joanna Radin, Julia A. Thomas, Russell H. Tuttle. Chicago Journal of History Vol-VII Autumn 2016. 

Living people
Historians of science
University of Wisconsin–Madison faculty
Princeton University alumni
University of Pennsylvania alumni
Year of birth missing (living people)